Ruth Carter Stapleton (née Carter; August 7, 1929 – September 26, 1983) was an American Christian evangelist. She was the youngest sister of United States President Jimmy Carter.

Early life and family
Ruth Carter was born August 7, 1929, in Plains, Georgia, the third of the four children in the family of James Earl Carter, Sr. and Lillian Gordy Carter.

Besides the former president, Stapleton had an older sister, Gloria (1926–1990), and a younger brother, Billy (1937–1988). All three of them died of pancreatic cancer, as well as their father.

Education, career, and family 
Stapleton attended Georgia State College for Women, earned her bachelor's in English from Methodist University, and her master's in psychology from the University of North Carolina at Chapel Hill.

Stapleton married Robert Thome Stapleton (1925–2014), a veterinarian, in 1948 and they had four children: Gloria Lynn (born May 31, 1950), Sydney Scott (December 23, 1951 – December 13, 2019), Patricia Gordy (born May 29, 1954) and Robert Michael (born November 5, 1958). Stapleton suffered from chronic depression, and was involved in a car accident which nearly cost her life during the time immediately following the birth of her children. She claimed to have been cured of depression later at a "Christ-centred camp".

In 1977, she became friends with pornographer Larry Flynt and managed to briefly convert him to Christianity. She was portrayed during this portion of Flynt's life by Donna Hanover in the film The People vs. Larry Flynt.

Stapleton was also known for her involvement in the healing ministry, especially in healing of memories. Her books The Gift of Inner Healing, The Experience of Inner Healing, and In His Footsteps: The Healing Ministry of Jesus, Then and Now, illustrate her beliefs on inner healing, which involved healing of memories in which a person would go over their memories and bring Jesus into the memory to help them forgive or be comforted as required by Jesus.

Death
She died of pancreatic cancer on September 26, 1983, aged 54. One month after her death, her mother died of breast cancer, aged 85.

Bibliography

References

Sources
Georgia Encyclopedia

1929 births
1983 deaths
People from Plains, Georgia
Carter family
Deaths from cancer in North Carolina
Deaths from pancreatic cancer
American evangelists
Women evangelists
Southern Baptists
American Charismatics
Christian writers
20th-century American politicians